Thorium(IV) iodide (ThI4) is an inorganic chemical compound composed of thorium and iodine. It is one of three known thorium iodides, the others being thorium(II) iodide and thorium(III) iodide.

References

Iodides
Actinide halides
Thorium compounds